Hollywood is an unincorporated community in Habersham County, Georgia, United States.

History
The community was named after the Holly clan of local Cherokee Indians.

References

Unincorporated communities in Habersham County, Georgia
Unincorporated communities in Georgia (U.S. state)